Motor Totemist Guild is an American rock band, formed in 1980 in Orange County, California by band leader James Grigsby. Described as an avant-prog, avant-rock and chamber rock band, Motor Totemist Guild was noted for its songs that worked into epic durations and rich instrumentation but also forayed into free improvisation, sound collage, and other avant-garde techniques.

History
Being the only constant member, Grigsby assembled an everchanging lineup, that featured vocalist Emily Hay, as well as Rod Poole (acoustic guitar), Bridget Convey (piano), Hannes Giger (contrabass), and David Kerman (drums). Grigsby disbanded the group in 1989 to focus on the project U-Totem. Nevertheless, Grigsby and Hay reunited the group in 1997 with a largely expanded lineup, including former members Lynn Johnston (clarinets, saxophone) and Eric Johnson-Tamai (bassoon). The new lineup also featured musicians from 1990s West Coast new jazz scene, such as Vinny Golia (clarinets, saxes), Jeff Kaiser (trumpet), and Brad Dutz (marimba and vibraphone). All of the band's albums were released through Grigsby's own label, Rotary Totem.

Members
James Grigsby - composition
 Emily Hay - vocals
 Rod Poole - acoustic guitar
 Bridget Convey - piano
 Hannes Giger - contrabass
 David Kerman - drums
 Lynn Johnston - clarinets, saxophone
 Eric Johnson-Tamai - bassoon
 Vinny Golia - clarinets, saxophone
 Jeff Kaiser - trumpet
 Brad Dutz - marimba and vibraphone

Discography
Motor Totemist Guild discography as adapted from Discogs:
Studio albums
 Infra Dig (1984)
 Klang (1985)
 Contact With Veils (1986)
 Elements (1988)
 Shapuno Zoo (1988)
 Omaggio A Futi (1989)
 City of Mirrors (1999)
 All America City (2000)

Singles
 "Sub-Mission" / "Ballad of the Thin Man" (1984)

Compilations
 Archive One (1996)
 Archive Two (1996)

References

External links

American experimental rock groups
Progressive rock musical groups from California
Musical groups from Orange County, California
Musical groups established in 1980